"The Yellow Wallpaper" (original title: "The Yellow Wall-paper. A Story") is a  short story by American writer Charlotte Perkins Gilman, first published in January 1892 in The New England Magazine. It is regarded as an important early work of American feminist literature for its illustration of the attitudes towards mental and physical health of women in the 19th century.  It is also lauded as an excellent work of horror fiction.

The story is written as a collection of journal entries narrated in the first person.  The journal was written by a woman whose physician husband has rented an old mansion for the summer. Forgoing other rooms in the house, the couple moves into the upstairs nursery. As a form of treatment, the husband forbids the journal writer from working or writing, and encourages her to eat well and get plenty of air so that she can recuperate from what he calls a "temporary nervous depression – a slight hysterical tendency", a common diagnosis in women at the time.  As the reader continues through the journal entries, they experience the writer's gradual descent into madness with nothing better to do than observe the peeling yellow wallpaper in her room.

Plot summary
The story describes a young woman and her husband. He imposes a rest cure on her when she suffers "temporary nervous depression" after the birth of their baby. They spend the summer at a colonial mansion, where the narrator is largely confined to an upstairs nursery.  The story makes striking use of an unreliable narrator in order to gradually reveal the degree to which her husband has "imprisoned" her due to her physical and mental condition: she describes torn wallpaper, barred windows, metal rings in the walls, a floor "scratched and gouged and splintered," a bed bolted to the floor, and a gate at the top of the stairs, but blames all these on children who must have resided there.

The narrator devotes many journal entries to describing the wallpaper in the room – its "sickly" color, its "yellow" smell, its bizarre and disturbing pattern like "an interminable string of toadstools, budding and sprouting in endless convolutions," its missing patches, and the way it leaves yellow smears on the skin and clothing of anyone who touches it. She describes how the longer one stays in the bedroom, the more the wallpaper appears to mutate, especially in the moonlight. With no stimulus other than the wallpaper, the pattern and designs become increasingly intriguing to the narrator. She soon begins to see a figure in the design. Eventually, she comes to believe that a woman is creeping on all fours behind the pattern. Believing she must free the woman in the wallpaper, she begins to strip the remaining paper off the wall.

When her husband arrives home, the narrator refuses to unlock her door. When he returns with the key, he finds her creeping around the room, rubbing against the wallpaper, and exclaiming, "I've got out at last... in spite of you."  He faints, but she continues to circle the room, creeping over his inert body each time she passes it, believing herself to have become the woman trapped behind the yellow wallpaper.

Interpretations

Gilman

Gilman used her writing to explore the role of women in America around 1900. She expanded upon many issues, such as the lack of a life outside the home and the "oppressive forces" of a "patriarchal society". Through her work, Gilman paved the way for writers such as Alice Walker and Sylvia Plath. 

In "The Yellow Wallpaper," she portrays the narrator's insanity as a way to protest the professional and societal oppression against women. While under the impression that husbands and male doctors were acting with their best interests in mind, women were depicted as mentally fragile. Women’s rights advocates of the era believed that the "outbreak" of this mental instability was the manifestation of their setbacks regarding the roles they were allowed to play in a male-dominated society. Women were even discouraged from writing because it would ultimately create an identity and become a form of defiance. Gilman realized that writing became one of the only forms of existence for women at a time when they had very few rights.

After the birth of her first daughter, Gilman suffered postnatal depression and was treated by Dr. Silas Weir Mitchell, the leading expert on women's mental health at the time. He suggested a strict 'rest cure' regimen involving much of bed rest and a blanket ban on working, including reading, writing, and painting. After three months and almost desperate, Gilman decided to contravene her diagnosis, along with the treatment methods, and started to work again. Aware of how close she had come to a complete mental breakdown, the author wrote ”The Yellow Wallpaper” with additions and exaggerations to illustrate her criticism of the medical field. Gilman sent a copy to Mitchell but never received a response. (Gilman was ultimately proven right in her disdain for the "rest cure" when she sought a second opinion from Mary Putnam Jacobi, one of the first female doctors and a strong opponent of this theory, who prescribed a regimen of physical and mental activity that proved a much more successful treatment.)

She added that "The Yellow Wallpaper" was "not intended to drive people crazy, but to save people from being driven crazy, and it worked". Gilman claimed that many years later, she learned that Mitchell had changed his treatment methods. However, literary historian Julie Bates Dock has discredited this. Mitchell continued his methods, and as late as 1908 – 16 years after "The Yellow Wallpaper" was published – was interested in creating entire hospitals devoted to the "rest cure" so that his treatments would be more widely accessible. Gilman gives her greatest thanks to Richard Bauer for being the only man who believed in her.

Feminist
This story has been interpreted by feminist critics as a condemnation of the male control of the 19th-century medical profession. Throughout the short story, the narrator offers many suggestions to help her get better, such as exercising, working, or socializing with the outside world.  Her ideas are dismissed immediately while using language that stereotypes her as irrational and, therefore, unqualified to offer ideas about her condition. This interpretation draws on the concept of the "domestic sphere" that women were held in during this period.

Many feminist critics focus on the degree of triumph at the end of the story. Although some claim the narrator slipped into insanity, others see the ending as a woman's assertion of agency in a marriage in which she felt trapped. The emphasis on reading and writing as gendered practices also illustrated the importance of the wallpaper. If the narrator were allowed neither to write in her journal nor to read, she would begin to "read" the wallpaper until she found the escape she was looking for. Through seeing the women in the wallpaper, the narrator realizes that she could not live her life locked up behind bars. At the end of the story, as her husband lies on the floor unconscious, she crawls over him, symbolically rising over him. This is interpreted as a victory over her husband at the expense of her sanity.

Susan S. Lanser, a professor at Brandeis University, praises contemporary feminism and its role in changing the study and the interpretation of literature. "The Yellow Wallpaper" was one of many stories that lost authority in the literary world because of an ideology that determined the works' content to be disturbing or offensive. Critics such as the editor of the Atlantic Monthly rejected the short story because "[he] could not forgive [himself] if [he] made others as miserable as [he] made [himself]". Lanser argues that the same argument of devastation and misery can be said about the work of Edgar Allan Poe.  "The Yellow Wallpaper" provided feminists the tools to interpret literature in different ways. Lanser argues that the short story was a "particularly congenial medium for such a re-vision... because the narrator herself engages in a form of feminist interpretation when she tries to read the paper on her wall". The narrator in the story is trying to find a single meaning in the wallpaper.  At first, she focuses on the contradictory style of the wallpaper: it is "flamboyant" while also "dull", "pronounced," yet "lame," and "uncertain" (p. 13).  She takes into account the patterns and tries to organize them geometrically, but she is further confused.  The wallpaper changes colors when it reflects light and emits a distinct odor that the protagonist cannot recognize (p. 25). At night the narrator can see a woman behind bars within the complex design of the wallpaper. Lanser argues that the unnamed woman was able to find "a space of text on which she can locate whatever self-projection". Just like the narrator as a reader, when one comes into contact with a confusing and complicated text, one tries to find a single meaning. "How we were taught to read," as Lanser puts it, is why a reader cannot fully comprehend the text. The patriarchal ideology had kept many scholars from being able to interpret and appreciate stories such as "The Yellow Wallpaper".  With the growth of feminist criticism, "The Yellow Wallpaper" has become a fundamental reading in the standard curriculum. Feminists have made a significant contribution to the study of literature but, according to Lanser, are falling short because if "we acknowledge the participation of women writers and readers in dominant patterns of thought and social practice then perhaps our own patterns must also be deconstructed if we are to recover meanings still hidden or overlooked."

Martha J. Cutter discusses how, in many of Charlotte Perkins Gilman's works, she addresses this "struggle in which a male-dominated medical establishment attempts to silence women". Gilman's works challenge the social construction of women in patriarchal medical discourse who are seen as "silent, powerless, and passive". At the time in which her works take place, between 1840 and 1890, women were exceedingly defined as lesser than—sickly and weak. In this time period it was thought that women who received formal education (amongst other causes) could develop hysteria, a now-discredited catchall term referring to most mental health diseases identified in women and erroneously believed to stem from a malfunctioning uterus (from the Greek hystera, "womb"). At the time, the medical understanding was that women who spent time in college or studying were over-stimulating their brains and consequently leading themselves into states of hysteria. Many of the diseases recognized in women were seen as a lack of self-control or self-rule. Different physicians argued that a physician must "assume a tone of authority" and that the idea of a "cured" woman is "subdued, docile, silent, and above all subject to the will and voice of the physician". A hysterical woman craves power. To be treated for her hysteria, she must submit to her physician, whose role is to undermine her desires. Often women were prescribed bed rest as a form of treatment, which was meant to "tame" them and keep them imprisoned. Treatments such as this were a way of ridding women of rebelliousness and forcing them to conform to expected social roles. In her works, Gilman highlights that the harm caused by these types of treatments for women, i.e., "the rest cure", has to do with how her voice is silenced. Paula Treichler explains: "In this story diagnosis 'is powerful and public.... It is a male voice that... imposes controls on the female narrator and dictates how she is to perceive and talk about the world.' Diagnosis covertly functions to empower the male physician's voice and disempower the female patient's." The narrator in "The Yellow Wallpaper" is not allowed to participate in her treatment or diagnosis and is completely forced to succumb to everything in which her doctor and in this particular story, her husband, says. The male voice is the one in which forces controls on the female and decides how she is allowed to perceive and speak about the world around her.

Other
"The Yellow Wallpaper" is sometimes cited as an example of Gothic literature for its themes of madness and powerlessness. Alan Ryan introduced the story by writing: "quite apart from its origins [it] is one of the finest, and strongest, tales of horror ever written. It may be a ghost story. Worse yet, it may not." Pioneering horror author H. P. Lovecraft writes in his essay Supernatural Horror in Literature (1927) that "'The Yellow Wall Paper' rises to a classic level in subtly delineating the madness which crawls over a woman dwelling in the hideously papered room where a madwoman was once confined". 

Helen Lefkowitz Horowitz wrote that "the story was a cri de coeur against Gilman's first husband, artist Charles Walter Stetson and the traditional marriage he had demanded." Gilman attempted to deflect blame to protect Gilman's daughter Katharine and her step-mother, Gilman's friend Grace Channing. Horowitz consults the sources of Charlotte's private life, including her daily journals, drafts of poems and essays, and intimate letters, and compares them to the diary accounts of her first husband. She also mines Charlotte's diaries for notes on her reading. She shows how specific poetry, fiction, and popular science shaped her consciousness and understanding of sex and gender, health and illness, emotion and intellect. Horowitz makes a case that "The Yellow Wall-Paper", in its original form, did not represent a literal protest against Mitchell (a neurologist who treated Gilman in 1887) and his treatment. Rather, it emerged from Charlotte's troubled relationship with her husband Walter, personified in the story's physician. In demanding a traditional wife, Walter denied Charlotte personal freedom, squelched her intellectual energy, and characterized her illness.

In another interpretation, Sari Edelstein has argued that "The Yellow Wallpaper" is an allegory for Gilman's hatred of the emerging yellow journalism. Having created The Forerunner in November 1909, Gilman made it clear she wished the press to be more insightful and not rely upon exaggerated stories and flashy headlines. Gilman was often scandalized in the media and resented the sensationalism of the media. The relationship between the narrator and the wallpaper within the story parallels Gilman's relationship with the press. The protagonist describes the wallpaper as having "sprawling flamboyant patterns committing every artistic sin". Edelstein argues that given Gilman’s distaste for the Yellow Press, this can also be seen as a description of tabloid newspapers of the day.

Paula A. Treichler focuses on the relationship portrayed in the short story between women and writing. Rather than write about the feminist themes which view the wallpaper as something along the lines of "...the 'pattern' which underlies sexual inequality, the external manifestation of neurasthenia, the narrator's unconscious, the narrator's situation within patriarchy", Treichler instead explains that the wallpaper can be a symbol to represent discourse and the fact that the narrator is alienated from the world in which she previously could somewhat express herself. Treichler illustrates that through this discussion of language and writing, in the story, Charlotte Perkins Gilman is defying the "...sentence that the structure of patriarchal language imposes". While Treichler accepts the legitimacy of strictly feminist claims, she writes that a closer look at the text suggests that the wallpaper could be interpreted as women's language and discourse. The woman found in the wallpaper could be the "...representation of women that becomes possible only after women obtain the right to speak". In making this claim, it suggests that the new struggle found within the text is between two forms of writing; one rather old and traditional, and the other new and exciting. This is supported in the fact that John, the narrator's husband, does not like his wife to write anything, which is why her journal containing the story is kept a secret and thus is known only by the narrator and reader. A look at the text shows that as the relationship between the narrator and the wallpaper grows stronger, so too does her language in her journal as she begins to increasingly write of her frustration and desperation.

Dramatic adaptations

Audio plays
Agnes Moorehead performed a version twice, in 1948 and 1957, on the radio program Suspense.
The CBC Radio drama Vanishing Point did a radio version of Mary Vingoe's adaptation for the stage at Toronto's Nightwood Theatre in 1985.
An audio book of "The Yellow Wallpaper" (1997) was produced by Durkin Hayes and read by Winifred Phillips. This Radio Tales version can also be heard on Sonic Theater on XM Radio.
BBC Radio modified and dramatized the story for the series Fear on Four, starring Anna Massey.
Stuff You Should Know read "The Yellow Wallpaper" as part of their October 31, 2017 episode "2017 Super Spooktacular".
Chatterbox Audio Theater adapted "The Yellow Wallpaper" for audio drama. The play was featured on its September 14, 2007 episode.
The Gray Area's Edward Champion adapted The Yellow Wallpaper for a modern day setting. The adaptation, which was dedicated to the #metoo movement, aired on The Sonic Society during its August 11, 2019 episode.
 YouTuber CGP Grey read "The Yellow Wallpaper" and released it on his channel on October 31, 2020. 
 Actress, director Beata Pozniak performed and published "The Yellow Wallpaper" as an audiobook for the Mental Awareness Month (2021)

Stage plays
Nightwood Theatre in Toronto, Canada collectively adapted the story for performance 1981.
Then This Theatre of Dublin, Ireland adapted Gilman's text for a widely acclaimed production at the 2011 Absolut Dublin Fringe Festival, featuring actress Maeve Fitzgerald and directed by Aoife Spillane-Hinks. The production was reprised in 2012 at Dublin's Project Arts Centre Cube.
 Heather Newman scripted and directed an adaptation of the original short story, as part of the 2003 season at Theater Schmeater, in Seattle, Washington. This adaptation won the 2003 Seattle Times "Best of the Fringe" award, and was also produced in 2005 at Tarrant County College by Dr. Judith Gallagher, and directed by Melinda Benton-Muller. In May 2010, Benton-Muller and Dr. Gallagher spoke on a panel about this adaptation at the American Literature Association, with members of the ALA and the Charlotte Perkins Gilman Society.
 Rummage Theatre researched, wrote and directed an hour long play called Behind the Wallpaper (first performed at The Bay Theatre in 2014). The play was inspired by "The Yellow Wallpaper", but focuses on exploring postnatal depression and postpartum psychosis in the present day and uses shadow work cast behind wallpaper to represent the "Shadow Woman" which new mother Julie sees as part of her psychosis. The play toured Dorset in 2014/2015.
A Company of Players presented a stage adaptation of the original short story, written and directed by Kristi Boulton, at the 2014 Hamilton Fringe Festival in Ontario, Canada. This production was well received by critics and won a "Best of Fringe" award.
Central Works of Berkeley presented a one-woman show consisting of the text of the play recited and performed by Elena Wright and with a TBA-nominated score written and performed by violinist Cybele D'Ambrosio in 2015.
 Portland, Oregon-based Coho Productions staged an adaptation written by Sue Mach in early 2016, which integrated "expressionistic audio, visual and movement interludes with the haunting literary text". The stage adaptation was co-produced and conceived by Grace Carter, who also portrays the primary character, Charlotte. The play was directed by Philip Cuomo.

Film
 In 1977, the story was adapted as a short film (14 min) as The Yellow Wallpaper by director Marie Ashton and screenwriter Julie Ashton; it starred Sigrid Wurschmidt.
 In 1989, the story was adapted as The Yellow Wallpaper by the British Broadcasting Corporation (BBC), later shown in the U.S. on Masterpiece Theatre. It was adapted by Maggie Wadey, directed by John Clive, and starred Julia Watson and Stephen Dillane.
 In 2009, the story was adapted by director John McCarty as a short (30 minute) film called Confinement starring Colleen Lovett. (McCarty had initially written a treatment of the story in the late 1960s on spec for a television anthology. The idea was shelved, but the treatment was eventually revised for Confinement.)
 In 2011, the story was loosely adapted into the feature-length film The Yellow Wallpaper, directed by Logan Thomas, starring Aric Cushing. (DVD release, 2015)
 British artist Julia Dogra-Brazell's short experimental film, The Rules of the Game (2015) also found inspiration in this text.
American filmmakers Alexandra Loreth and Kevin Pontuti produced and directed a feature-length film adaptation titled The Yellow Wallpaper (2021). The film premiered at Cinequest Film Festival in 2021.

See also
 Maria: or, The Wrongs of Woman – an unfinished novel about a woman imprisoned in an asylum
 Changeling – a film about a woman imprisoned in a mental hospital

References

Bibliography

 Carnley, Peter (2001). The Yellow Wallpaper and other sermons HarperCollins, Sydney

Further reading

 Bak, John S. (1994). "Escaping the Jaundiced Eye: Foucauldian Panopticism in Charlotte Perkins Gilman's 'The Yellow Wallpaper'", Studies in Short Fiction 31.1 (Winter 1994), pp. 39–46.
 Barkat, Sara N. (2020). "Literary Analysis: The Yellow Wall-Paper Affects Us All", at Tweetspeak Poetry (Spring 2020)
 Crewe, Jonathan (1995). "Queering 'The Yellow Wallpaper'?  Charlotte Perkins Gilman and the Politics of Form", Tulsa Studies in Women's Literature 14 (Fall 1995), pp. 273–293.
 Cutter, Martha J.  "The Writer as Doctor: New Models of Medical Discourse in Charlotte Perkins Gilman's Later Fictions". Literature and Medicine 20. 2 (Fall 2001): pp. 151–182.
 Gilbert, Sandra and Gubar, Susan (1980). The Madwoman in the Attic. Yale University Press. 
 Gilman, Charlotte Perkins. "Why I wrote The Yellow Wallpaper", The Forerunner, October 1913, accessed November 15, 2009.
 Golden, Catherine (1989).  "The Writing of ‘The Yellow Wallpaper’ A Double Palimpsest", Studies in American Fiction, 17 (Autumn 1989), pp. 193–201.
 Haney-Peritz, Janice.  "Monumental Feminism and Literature’s Ancestral House: Another Look at ‘The Yellow Wallpaper", Women’s Studies 12 (1986): 113–128.
 Hume, Beverly A. "Gilman’s ‘Interminable Grotesque’: The Narrator of ‘The Yellow Wallpaper", Studies in Short Fiction 28 (Fall 1991):  477–484.
 Johnson, Greg.  "Gilman’s Gothic Allegory: Rage and Redemption in ‘The Yellow Wallpaper.’"  Studies in Short Fiction 26 (Fall 1989):  521–530.
 King, Jeannette, and Pam Morris.  "On Not Reading Between the Lines: Models of Reading in ‘The Yellow Wallpaper.’"  Studies in Short Fiction 26.1 (Winter 1989):  23–32.
 Klotz, Michael. "Two Dickens Rooms in 'The Yellow Wall-Paper'", Notes and Queries (December 2005): 490–1.
 Knight, Denise D.  "The Reincarnation of Jane: 'Through This' – Gilman’s Companion to ‘The Yellow Wall-paper.’"  Women’s Studies 20 (1992):  287–302.
 Lanser, Susan S.  "Feminist Criticism, 'The Yellow Wallpaper', and the Politics of Color in America". Feminist Studies 15 (Fall 1989):  415–437.

External links
 
 
 Full Text of The Yellow Wallpaper. Retrieved January 22, 2008.
 Full text of The Yellow Wallpaper at the CUNY Library
 The Yellow Wallpaper, audio, CBS radio, 1948.
 
 The Yellow Wallpaper A 2006 film inspired by the short story that relies on the gothic/horror interpretation.
 The Yellow Wall-Paper: A Graphic Novel (Unabridged) A 2020 experimental graphic novel containing the unabridged text of the original story.
 EDSITEment's lesson plan Charlotte Perkins Gilman's Yellow Wall-Paper
 
 

1892 short stories
American short stories
Works originally published in The New England Magazine
Feminist short stories
Horror short stories
Gothic short stories
Fictional diaries
Fiction with unreliable narrators
Short stories about mental health
Short stories adapted into films
Novels about sleep disorders
Works set in country houses